Roshal is a Jewish surname deriving from  ("Rabbi Shlomo Luria").

Notable people with this surname include:
Alexander Roshal (1936–2007), a Soviet chess journalist, founder of the magazine 64
Eugene Roshal, creator of RAR file format for data compression and archiving, and FAR file manager
Grigori Roshal (1899–1983), a Soviet film director
Leonid Roshal (b. 1933), a Russian pediatrician

See also 
 Roshal (town), a town in Moscow Oblast, Russia

Jewish surnames
Hebrew-language surnames